Margaret of Foix (French: Marguerite de Foix; c. 1449– 15 May 1486) was Duchess of Brittany from 1474 to 1486 by marriage to Duke Francis II.

Life
She was the daughter of Queen Eleanor of Navarre (1425–1479) and of Gaston IV, Count of Foix (1425–1472).

On 27 June 1471, at the Château de Clisson, she married Francis II, Duke of Brittany (1435–1488), son of Richard of Brittany, Count of Étampes (1395–1438), and Margaret of Orléans, Countess of Vertus (1406–1466). It was Francis's second marriage, his first wife, Margaret of Brittany, having died in 1469.

Margaret of Foix died at the Château de Nantes in Nantes and is interred in the Cathedral of St. Peter and St. Paul (French: Cathédrale Saint-Pierre-et-Saint-Paul) beside her husband and Margaret of Brittany, in a magnificent tomb constructed in the early French Renaissance style.

Issue
Anne of Brittany (1477–1514), Duchess of Brittany (1488–1514), and twice Queen of France: from 1491 to 1498 as the wife of King Charles VIII of France, and from 1499 to 1514 as the wife of King Louis XII of France.
Isabeau of Brittany (1478–1490), betrothed to Jean d'Albret in 1481, died young, and was buried in the Rennes Cathedral.

References

Sources

1440s births
1486 deaths
House of Foix
House of Dreux
15th-century Breton women
Duchesses of Brittany
Navarrese infantas